The following lists events that happened during 1878 in the Kingdom of Belgium.

Incumbents
Monarch: Leopold II
Prime Minister: Jules Malou (to 19 June); Walthère Frère-Orban (from 19 June)

Events

 May to November – Belgium participates in the Paris Universal Exhibition.
 27 May – Provincial elections
 11-18 June – Partial legislative elections of 1878 (first with voting booths to ensure a secret ballot)
 19 June – Walthère Frère-Orban replaces Jules Malou as Prime Minister 
 22-25 August – Twenty-fifth wedding anniversary celebrations of King Leopold II and Queen Marie-Henriette, including a parade of 23,000 school children on 23 August.
 13 November – Jules Guillery succeeds as Charles Rogier as Speaker of the Chamber of Representatives

Publications
Periodicals
 Almanach de Poche de Bruxelles (Brussels, H. Manceaux)
 Annuaire de l'Observatoire royal de Bruxelles, 46 (Brussels, F. Hayez)
 Annuaire du Conservatoire Royal de Musique de Bruxelles, 2 (Brussels, Librairie Européenne C. Muquardt)
 Bulletin de la Société belge de géographie, 2 (Brussels, Secrétariat de la Société Belge de Géographie)
 Bulletins de l'Académie royale des sciences, des lettres et des beaux-arts de Belgique, 47 (Brussels, M. Hayez).
 Le Moniteur Belge.
 Revue de l'horticulture belge et étrangère (Ghent, Bureaux de la Revue)
 Revue du notariat belge, 4 (Brussels, Bureau de la Revue)

Books
 Hendrik Conscience, De Schat van Felix Roobeek
 Henri Guillaume, Histoire de l'infanterie wallonne sous la maison d'Espagne, 1500–1800 (Brussels, Académie Royale)

Art and architecture

Buildings
 Great Synagogue of Brussels completed

Paintings
 Félicien Rops, Pornocrates

Births
 18 January – Henri Baels, politician (died 1951)
 19 February – Henri Carton de Tournai, politician (died 1969)
 5 March – Gaston Salmon, fencer (died 1917)
 10 March – Karel van de Woestijne, author (died 1929)
 16 March – Émile Cammaerts, author (died 1953)
 29 March – Jules Pire, resistance leader (died 1953)
 14 April – August Borms, quisling (died 1946)
 23 June – Gustave Strauven, architect (died 1919)
 1 July – Joseph Maréchal, Jesuit (died 1944)
 5 July – Jean de Bosschère, writer and painter (died 1953)
 6 July – Charles Terlinden, historian (died 1972)
 15 July – Hendrik De Vocht, scholar (died 1962)
 13 September – Oscar Joliet, bishop (died 1969)
 20 November – Joseph-Marie Canivez, Trappist (died 1952)

Deaths
 18 January – Frans de Cort (born 1834), writer
 9 July – Barthélemy Charles Joseph Dumortier (born 1797), botanist and politician
 7 August – Joseph Gustave Ernest Allard (born 1840), politician
 16 November – Charles Vilain XIIII (born 1803), politician

References

 
1870s in Belgium
Belgium
Years of the 19th century in Belgium
Belgium